The Newer Way is a 1915 American short film directed by  B. Reeves Eason.

Cast
 Joseph Galbraith
 Louise Lester
 Jack Richardson
 Vivian Rich

External links

1915 films
1915 short films
American silent short films
American black-and-white films
Films directed by B. Reeves Eason
1910s American films